Escola Técnica Estadual, or ETEC, is characteristic of the state of São Paulo, and is a reference to their technical courses and school quality.

History
It was designed by Roberto de Abreu Sodré Costa, governor of the state in 1967. In 1969, the network was assumed by the Centro Paula Souza, now there's ETEC 198. The ETEC's are the most prestigious public network of the state of São Paulo.

Statistics
6000 teachers
ETEC 198 units in 150 counties
70% of students in technical courses out of school employees.
190.000 students
Including high school, the ETEC's 102 courses have

Requirements
High School: Finished primary school.

Technical Education: Be enrolled in two high school degree or higher, and be over 16 years.

Selection process
As a way of selecting students is applied a test with 50 questions alternatives, which include materials and themes of the school and also general matters.

See also
Universities and higher education in Brazil

Higher education in Brazil
Education policy in Brazil